is a park located in Nakahara-ku ward, Kawasaki, in Kanagawa Prefecture, Japan. It is famous for its sport facilities including an athletics stadium, gym, a baseball field, a pool, a tennis court, and it contains a museum as well.

Main facilities  
 Todoroki Athletics Stadium, the home stadium of Kawasaki Frontale
 Todoroki Arena

Access  
 The park is located approximately 20 minutes walk from Musashi-Nakahara Station on the Nambu Line.
 A bus from Musashi-Kosugi Station that stops at the park is available.

References

External links 
 Official webpage 

Parks and gardens in Kanagawa Prefecture